Chris Grassie (born 21 September 1978) is an English soccer coach who is currently the head coach of the Marshall University men's soccer team.  During his tenure as coach of the Herd, he led the program to its first 2 Conference USA titles and the 2020 NCAA National Championship.

Playing career
As a player at Alderson Broaddus, Grassie was named to the all-conference team multiple times and was a team captain.  He majored in political science and history.

Grassie played in England from 2002 to 2003 with Northwich Victoria F.C.

Coaching career
Grassie began his coaching career as an assistant at his alma mater, Alderson Broaddus University in Philippi, West Virginia.  After one season, he became a graduate assistant at Marshall University under coach Bob Gray from 2004-2006.

Grassie would move on to become an assistant coach at the University of Michigan from 2007 to 2010. The Wolverines won the Big Ten championship in 2010 and advanced to the 2010 College Cup semifinals, losing to eventual national champion Akron.  After the 2010 season, Grassie accepted the head coaching position at the University of Charleston.

During his 6 seasons at Charleston, Grassie would win 6 conference tournaments and 5 regular season titles as the Golden Eagles moved from the now-defunct West Virginia Intercollegiate Athletic Conference to the Mountain East Conference.  While at Charleston, Grassie coached eight All-Americans and four former players landed professional contracts.  His teams advanced to 3 NCAA Division II Final Fours, finishing runner-up twice.

Grassie became head coach of the Marshall Thundering Herd on January 10, 2017. Days after winning the 2020 NCAA Tournament, Grassie was recognized as the United Soccer Coaches College Coach of the Year for the season and was given a five year contract extension through 2025 with a pay increase from $122,000 to $375,750 annually.

Honors

Coaching
University of Charleston
 WVIAC Tournament & regular season champions: 2011, 2012
 MEC regular season champion: 2014, 2015, 2016
 MEC Tournament champions: 2013, 2014, 2015, 2016
 NCAA Division II Runner Up: 2014, 2016

Marshall University
 C-USA regular season champions: 2019, 2020
 C-USA Tournament champions: 2019
 NCAA College Cup: 2020

Individual
 MEC Coach of the Year: 2014, 2015
 C-USA Coach of the Year: 2019, 2020
 United Soccer Coaches College Coach of the Year: 2020
 Top Drawer Soccer Coach of the Year: 2020-21

References

External links
 Marshall profile

1978 births
Living people
English footballers
Association football goalkeepers
Alderson Broaddus Battlers men's soccer coaches
Alderson Broaddus Battlers men's soccer players
Charleston Golden Eagles men's soccer coaches
Footballers from Newcastle upon Tyne
Marshall Thundering Herd men's soccer coaches
Michigan Wolverines men's soccer coaches
Northwich Victoria F.C. players
English expatriate sportspeople in the United States